Baseball is a sport formerly contested at the Summer Olympic Games. It was originally played as a demonstration sport in seven Olympics—1912, 1936, 1952, 1956, 1964, 1984, and 1988— more than for any other sport in Olympic history. These exhibitions featured a single game at the first five Olympic appearances and then a tournament format in 1984 and 1988. The International Olympic Committee (IOC) granted baseball official status on October 13, 1986, for the 1992 Summer Olympics. The sport was contested at each subsequent Games through 2008, after which the IOC removed it from the roster of Olympic sports.

In 1992, the first official Olympic baseball tournament was won by the Cuban team. Cuba had boycotted the 1984 and 1988 Olympics, missing the previous exhibition baseball tournaments, but entered in 1992 as the favorite, having won the past 12 world championships and with a 62–1 record in international competitions since 1986. The Cubans went undefeated in the 1992 Olympics and trailed in only one game. They went undefeated again at the 1996 Olympics en route to a second consecutive gold medal. The United States won their first medal (bronze) in the 1996 Olympics and then won gold at the 2000 Summer Olympics. 2000 was the first Olympics in which Cuba lost a game: first to the Dutch team in round-robin play and then again to the Americans in the gold medal game. This was also the first time professional players were allowed to compete in baseball, though Major League Baseball (MLB) did not permit any player on the 40-man roster of an MLB team to compete. In 2004, the reigning gold medalist United States did not qualify for the Olympic tournament, while the Cuban team won its third gold medal.

In 2005, the IOC investigated the addition of sports to the Olympic schedule including golf, rugby sevens, and karate. The IOC voted on July 8, 2005 to remove baseball and softball from the 2012 Summer Olympics roster, the first sports removed from the Olympics since polo in 1936. A variety of factors were cited for removing baseball including the absence of MLB players, problems with performance-enhancing drugs, and the high cost of constructing a baseball stadium. Appeals to reinstate both sports for 2012 were rejected. Baseball was still played at the 2008 Summer Olympics in Beijing, however, and the South Korean team beat Cuba to claim their first gold medal in the event. The international governing bodies of several sports, including baseball, petitioned the IOC in 2009 to fill two sport slots at the 2016 Olympics. IOC President Jacques Rogge said they were "looking for an added value – wide appeal, especially for young people." The IOC ultimately voted to fill the two available slots for 2016 with rugby and golf. However, the IOC ultimately approved the return of baseball and softball to the Olympic program for the 2020 Summer Olympics in Tokyo in 2016.

Baseball was open only to male amateurs in 1992 and 1996. As a result, the Americans and other nations where professional baseball is developed relied on collegiate players, while Cubans used their most experienced veterans, who technically were considered amateurs as they nominally held other jobs, but in fact trained full-time. In 2000, pros were admitted, but the MLB refused to release its players in 2000, 2004, and 2008, and the situation changed only a little: the Cubans still used their best players, while the Americans started using minor leaguers. The IOC cited the absence of the best players as the main reason for baseball being dropped from the Olympic program.

Cuba has been the most successful team, winning the most gold and silver medals and never finishing outside the podium. Cuban pitcher Pedro Luis Lazo is the most successful individual athlete, winning four medals—two gold and two silver—from 1996 to 2008. No American ever appeared in the Olympics more than once. Nine other Cuban players won three medals; no player from any other nation accomplished this feat. From the 25 athletes who won two medals in baseball, 18 were Cuban, while the remaining seven included 4 South Korean and 3 Japanese players.

Medal winners

Athlete medal leaders
Athletes who won at least two gold medals or three total medals are listed below.

See also
Baseball awards
Baseball at the Summer Olympics
Baseball World Cup
Women's Baseball World Cup
Intercontinental Cup (baseball)
World Baseball Classic
List of Asian Games medalists in baseball

References

General

Specific

Baseball
medalists
Olympic medalists

Olympics